Johnson Creek is a stream in Lafayette County in the U.S. state of Missouri. It is a tributary of Davis Creek.

Johnson Creek most likely has the name of William Johnson, a pioneer citizen.

See also
List of rivers of Missouri

References

Rivers of Lafayette County, Missouri
Rivers of Missouri